The March 2015 North American winter storm was a significant snow and ice storm that plowed through much of the United States, bringing  of snow and record cold temperatures behind it. The storm actually occurred in two phases, with the latter bringing the cold temperatures behind it in its wake. Record cold temperatures even spread down to as far as northern Florida.

Meteorological history 
The first phase of the storm came on March 2, as a vigorous area of low pressure formed along an arctic cold front. Drawing some moisture from the so-called "Pineapple Express" from the Pacific, snowfall began to develop in the Upper Midwest, spreading a swath of accumulating snow ranging from  into March 3. Snow began to push into the Northeast by the evening, with generally light accumulations, before tapering off and changing to rain showers later that night. As the initial area of low pressure moved into the northeastern parts of Canada, its cold front lingered, stretching from Maine to western Texas. Because of the "Pineapple Express" pumping moisture into just about the same area where this arctic front was set up, snow began to break out as a plume of precipitation began to take shape by mid-day on March 4. This was the start of the final phase of the winter storm. An icing threat also loomed ahead as well, stretching into the southwestern part of the Mid-Atlantic. A new area of low pressure then formed near the Arkansas–Louisiana border and began to track eastward. Rain changed to moderate snowfall by 1 a.m EDT March 5, as cold air began to sink in. A long swath of snow then began to stretch from the southeastern tip of Massachusetts, into New York City, all the way down to the northern parts of Mississippi. Snow from this system was that of the dry, fluffy kind, which was one reason power outages weren't so severe in the Northeast, however there was more in the ice portion of the storm. The storm continued to dump snow, ice and sleet across the eastern half of the United States, before moving off the coast late on March 5, leaving snow accumulations of  into the Northeast, and record cold in its wake, with some areas, like Jackson, Mississippi, experiencing a near 50 °F (28 °C) drop in 24 hours as the arctic front moved through. Several daily, and monthly, record lows were set.

Impact

Snowfall totals 
This is a list of the largest snowfall reports by state impacted by the storm. Source:

 Illinois

  in Brookport and Mound City

 Indiana

  in Charlestown

 Iowa

  in Olin

 Kansas

  in Liberal

 Michigan

  in Newberry

 Minnesota

  in Wrenshall

 Missouri

  in Kennett

 Nebraska

  near Harrison

 Ohio

  near Waterloo

 South Dakota

  near Porcupine

 Wisconsin

  in Iron River

 Connecticut

  at Ledyard Center

 Maine

  near Fort Kent

 Maryland

  at Highfield

 Massachusetts

  at Dennisport

 New Hampshire

  in Pittsburg

 New Jersey

  in Scotch Plains and Roselle Park

 New York

  in Great Kills

 Pennsylvania

  in East Nantmeal

 Rhode Island

  at Saunderstown and South Kingstown

 Vermont

  near Cabot

 Virginia

  at Washington Dulles International Airport,

 West Virginia

  in Buckeye and Davis

 Arkansas

  near Bono

 Kentucky

  near Radcliff

 Mississippi

  near Horn Lake

 Oklahoma

  in Cordell

 Tennessee

  in Martin

 Texas

  in Grapevine

 Arizona

  near Parks

 California

  at Squaw Valley

 Colorado

  at Schofield Pass

 Nevada

  at Diamond Peak Ski Resort

 New Mexico

  at Taos Ski Area

 Utah

  at Buckboard Flat

 Wyoming

  on Casper Mountain

Travel 

The winter storm snarled travel across many areas in the United States, including a massive pileup on Interstate 65 in Kentucky, in which some people were stranded on the highway for hours. Several other travel-related issues included a 14-car pileup on Interstate 459 in Alabama, a jackknifed semi and flipped snow plow in Washington D.C., a  Delta plane traveling from Atlanta to New York City skidding off a snowy runway at LaGuardia Airport, and much more.

Parks closed 

The ice caves at Apostle Islands National Lakeshore were temporarily closed due to the winter storm.

Records 

Multiple records were set during and after the storm, with primary more after the storm had past.

Below is a list of records set during the winter storm. Sources:

 Heaviest two-day snowstorm in Lexington, Kentucky
 Multiple record lows for March 5–6 across the Lower 48.
 Lowest March temperature in Pittsburgh, Paducah, Kentucky and Urbana, Illinois

References 

2015–16 North American winter
March 2015 events in the United States
2015 natural disasters in the United States
Natural disasters in Colorado
Natural disasters in Mississippi